The Pine Grove Area School District is a public school district in Schuylkill County, Pennsylvania. It serves the municipalities of Pine Grove, Tremont, Frailey Township, Washington Township, Pine Grove Township, and Tremont Township. 

The district includes one elementary, one middle, and one high school. According to 2000 federal census data, it serves a resident population of 11,284.

Notes

School districts in Schuylkill County, Pennsylvania